Dumara may refer to:

 Dumara, Gujarat, a village in Abdasa Taluka, Kutch District, Gujarat, India
 Dumara, Indonesia, a village in Bolaang Mongondow Regency, North Sulawesi, Indonesia
 Dumara, Nepal, a village development committee in Kapilvastu District in southern Nepal
 Dumara, Papua New Guinea, a village in South Fly District, Western Province, Papua New Guinea
 Dumara, Philippines, a village in Lapuyan municipality, in the province of Zamboanga del Sur, Philippines
 Dumara, Uttar Pradesh, a village in Dudhi Tehsil, Sonbhadra District, Uttar Pradesh, India

See also
 Dumaraha, a village development committee in Sunsari District in south-eastern Nepal
 Dumaran, Palawan, a municipality in Palawan Province, Philippines
 Dumarao, Capiz, a municipality in Capiz Province, Philippines
 Joe Dumars, an American basketball player